Santosh is a much-delayed Indian Hindi-language film rleased in 1989 starring Manoj Kumar and Hema Malini.

Cast
 Manoj Kumar as Santosh Singh
 Hema Malini as Kavita
 Raakhee as Rachna
 Shatrughan Sinha as Avinash
 Sarika as Munni
 Prem Chopra as Kundan
 Amjad Khan as Qaidi No.333
 Nirupa Roy as Kamla Singh
 Kamini Kaushal as Shanti
 Madan Puri as Kaka
 Abhi Bhattacharya as Kavita's father
 Pinchoo Kapoor as Kailashpathi
 Om Shivpuri as Ratna's father 
 Praveen Kumar as Kundan's Man

Soundtrack

 Yun Lagne Lagi Aajkal Zindgani - Nitin Mukesh & Lata Mangeshkar
 Kehkahon Ke Liye Hum - Mahendra Kapoor
 Arre Logon Tumhe Kya Hai - Lata Mangeshkar
 Aaj Main Bechain Hoon - Mahendra Kapoor

External links 
 

1989 films
1980s Hindi-language films